The Sulawesi pitta (Erythropitta celebensis) is a species of pitta. It was considered a subspecies of the red-bellied pitta.  It is endemic to Indonesia where it occurs in Sulawesi, Manterawu, and Togian Islands.  Its natural habitat is subtropical or tropical moist lowland forest.  It is threatened by habitat loss.

References

Sulawesi pitta
Endemic birds of Sulawesi
Sulawesi pitta